"Tonight with Love" is a single by Canadian country music artist Carroll Baker. Released in 1976, it was the fourth single from her album Carroll Baker. The song reached number one on the RPM Country Tracks chart in Canada in July 1976.

Chart performance

References

1976 singles
Carroll Baker songs
1976 songs
RCA Records singles
Songs written by Don Grashey